Voices from Chernobyl: The Oral History of a Nuclear Disaster (titled Chernobyl Prayer: A Chronicle of the Future in the UK) is a book about the Chernobyl disaster by the Belarusian Nobel Laureate Svetlana Alexievich. At the time of the disaster (April 1986), Alexievich was a journalist living in Minsk, the capital of what was then the Byelorussian Soviet Socialist Republic. Alexievich interviewed more than 500 eyewitnesses, including firefighters, liquidators (members of the cleanup team), politicians, physicians, physicists, and ordinary citizens over a period of 10 years. The book relates the psychological and personal tragedy of the Chernobyl accident, and explores the experiences of individuals and how the disaster affected their lives.

Chernobyl Prayer was first published in Russian in 1997 as Чернобыльская молитва; a revised, updated edition was released in 2013. The American translation was awarded the 2005 National Book Critics Circle Award for general non-fiction.

Adaptations
The HBO television miniseries Chernobyl often relies on the memories of Pripyat locals, as told by Svetlana Alexievich in her book.

Editions

See also
 List of books about nuclear issues
 List of Chernobyl-related articles
 The Truth About Chernobyl

References

2005 non-fiction books
Books about the Chernobyl disaster
National Book Critics Circle Award-winning works
Dalkey Archive Press books